Hurricane (a.k.a. The film stars Iwan Rheon, with Milo Gibson, Stefanie Martini, Marcin Dorociński, Kryštof Hádek and Christopher Jaciow in supporting roles. Hurricane depicts the experiences of a group of Polish pilots of No. 303 Squadron RAF ( 303) in the Battle of Britain in the Second World War. The film had its premiere in Warsaw, Poland on 17 August 2018. It was released in the UK on the 7 September 2018.

The movie debuted at almost exactly the same time as the Polish production 303 Squadron: The True Story, often leading to confusion between two films, especially in Poland.

Plot
The pilots of No. 303 Squadron RAF, are a group of Polish fliers who have escaped from Europe, following the Nazi invasions of Poland and France, to join the Royal Air Force.  Czech Josef František, refusing to become a bomber pilot, invites himself into the newly formed unit. Canadian RAF pilot John Kent, who became affectionately known as "Kentowski", has his work cut out for him when he is handed the angry and often maligned squadron to command. Piloting Hawker Hurricane fighter aircraft, 303 Squadron works through language barriers, cultural differences and their grief on the loss of loved ones to become highly effective in the Battle of Britain. At the conclusion, the Polish pilots are told that they will be repatriated to communist Poland.

Cast
 Iwan Rheon as Jan Zumbach
 Milo Gibson as John A. Kent
 Stefanie Martini as Phyllis Lambert
 Kryštof Hádek as Josef František
 Marcin Dorociński as Witold Urbanowicz
 Christopher Jaciow as Zdzisław Henneberg
 Nicholas Farrell as Sir Hugh Dowding
 Robert Portal as Keith Park
 Teresa Mahoney as McCormac

Zygmunt Klein was the factual Jewish pilot portrayed in the film talking to Zumbach by the coach in the scene overlooking the sea at Broadstairs.

Production
The script is not a historical depiction of all events. One news item provided this comment after researching the content of the film and the actual history: "the film attempted to stick close to fact, but the needs of dramatic action often swayed the plot into fictitious and occasionally unrealistic narratives". In late 2017 and early 2018 some scenes were shot on the Kent coast at Stone Bay and Victoria Gardens in Broadstairs.

Reception

The review in The Guardian was mixed, with a 3/5 star rating. Leslie Felperin made this concluding comment: "The lack of budget, relative to Dunkirk at least, is glaring in the aerial dogfights, and the score is too maudlin and on the nose, but director David Blair navigates the whole thing through the storm with watchable competence".

Home Media
Mission of Honor was released April 30, 2019, by Cinedigm on Region A Bluray, DVD, and streaming video.

References

Further reading
 Josef Frantisek: The Battle of Britain's Czech hero 
 Fighting Back by Martin Sugarman, 2017 pub by Valentine Mitchell - chapter on Jews in the Battle of Britain; details on Zygmunt Klein 
 Olson, Lynne and Stanley Cloud. A Question of Honor: the Kościuszko Squadron in World War II. New York: Random House, 2003. .

External links
 
 Hurricane at Rotten Tomatoes

2018 films
British war drama films
British World War II films
British multilingual films
Polish multilingual films
British historical action films
Polish biographical drama films
British biographical drama films
Biographical action films
Battle of Britain films
2018 war drama films
2018 multilingual films
2018 drama films
Polish war drama films
Films directed by David Blair (director)
2010s British films
Polish epic films
British epic films
2010s English-language films
2010s Polish-language films